Dalhem (also referred to as Dalhem and Hallvide), is a populated area, a socken (not to be confused with parish), on the Swedish island of Gotland. It comprises the same area as the administrative Dalhem District, established on 1January 2016.

Geography 
Dalhem is the name of the socken as well as the district. It is also the name of the small village surrounding the medieval Dalhem Church, sometimes referred to as Dalhem kyrkby. It is situated in central Gotland. The area is rural with farms, tourism and equestrian facilities as the main sources of income.

, Dalhem Church belongs to Dalhem parish in Romaklosters pastorat, along with the churches in Ganthem, Hörsne and Ekeby.

The Dunbodi General Store Museum in Dalhem, is a shop from the early 1900s, preserved as a museum.

Railway 
The narrow-gauge railway on Gotland was decommissioned in the beginning of the 1960s. However, short parts of the railway tracks are still preserved. The most well-kept of these is the railway at Dalhem. The railway is maintained by the Gotland Train Association.

Gallery

References

External links 

Objects from Dalhem at the Digital Museum by Nordic Museum
Gotland Train Association

Populated places in Gotland County
Heritage railways in Sweden
Cultural heritage of Sweden
Tourism in Sweden
Agriculture in Sweden